is a Japanese surname. This surname said to have origin Ikarashi river, that flows in central Niigata Prefecture.
The name of Ikarashi comes from the ancient legend of Yamato prince Ikatarashihiko-no-mikoto (五十日足彦命), pioneer of this region, or Ainu word Inkar-us-i ("overlook-always doing-place", same etymology with Engaru).

Notable people with the surname include:

, Japanese manga artist
, Japanese jazz saxophonist
, Japanese swimmer
, Japanese manga artist
, Japanese figure skater
, Japanese voice actress
, Japanese dancer and record producer
, Japanese gymnast
, Japanese scholar and murder victim
, Japanese supercentenarian
, Japanese aikidoka
, Japanese footballer
, Japanese basketball player
, Japanese video game producer and director
, Japanese politician
, Japanese artist
, Japanese long-distance runner
, Japanese manga artist
, Japanese ice hockey player
, Japanese keyboardist and songwriter
, Japanese actress and voice actress
, Japanese baseball player
, Japanese manga artist
, Japanese actor
, Japanese anime director
, Japanese boxer
, Japanese badminton player
, Japanese golfer
, Japanese manga artist and artist
, Japanese writer
, Japanese-American Surfer

Fictional characters
, the secretary of the Student Council in Kakegurui
, protagonist of the manga series Deadman Wonderland
, main character who can transform as Kamen Rider Revi in Kamen Rider Revice

Japanese-language surnames